Australia competed in the Winter Olympic Games for the third time at the 1956 Winter Olympics at Cortina d'Ampezzo, Italy. Australia sent 10 athletes (8 men, 2 women) that competed in alpine skiing, figure skating and speed skating.

Colin Hickey's 7th place in both 500 and 1000 metre speed skating would be Australia's best result until the 1976 Winter Olympics, where Colin Coates came 6th in 10000 metre speed skating.

Alpine skiing

Men

Women

Figure skating

Speed skating

See also
Australia at the Winter Olympics

References

External links
Australia NOC
Olympic Winter Institute of Australia
"Australians at the Olympics: A definitive history" by Gary Lester  (suspected errata listed in Errata/0949853054)
"2002 Australian Winter Olympic Team Guide" PDF file
"The Compendium: Official Australian Olympic Statistics 1896-2002" Australian Olympic Committee  (Inconsistencies in sources mentioned in Wikibooks:Errata/0702234257)
"Winter Olympic Representatives 1924 - 2002" Ice Skating Australia

Nations at the 1956 Winter Olympics
1956
Winter sports in Australia
1956 in Australian sport